The Accounting Standards Board (AcSB) establishes accounting standards for use by private enterprises and private sector not-for-profit organizations. The AcSB contributes to the development of International Financial Reporting Standards (IFRSs) by participating in consultations and activities of the International Accounting Standards Board (IASB) to ensure Canadian publicly accountable entities' financial reporting needs are considered. The AcSB develops and participates in the development of high-quality financial reporting standards.

As an independent body, the AcSB is intended to make clients confident and promote objectivity , which helps organizations make informed decisions on where to allocate their financial assets.

Responsibilities 
According to their Terms of Reference, their responsibilities include:
 the creation of financial accounting standards following review, 
 implementing effective working standards for themselves, 
 researching financial reporting standards in order to refine theirs, 
 communication with stakeholders,
 being accountable to the oversight council,
 advising the oversight council as to what budget and amount of human resources and are needed to accomplish their goals.

Stakeholders 
The AcSB's stakeholders include preparers, auditors, advisors and financial statement users in the following sectors: 
 Private enterprises. 
 Not-for-profit organizations (NFPOs).
 Publicly accountable entities.

Members 
Ten voting and three non-voting members make up the AcSB, including a paid Chair. View current AcSB members.

The AcSB membership consists of a diverse group of members with a range of experience from various locations across Canada.

The Board's support staff comprises:
 a Director;  
 11 principals; and  
 two administrative assistants.

The Board also hires consultants as the need arises.

Setting standards 
Generally accepted accounting principles (GAAP) are intended to apply to general purposes financial statements that meet common information needs for a range of users, but there are limits to how much latitude GAAP can provide for diversity in practice. 
As a result, in 2005, the AcSB developed a strategy whereby separate accounting frameworks were adopted for publicly accountable enterprises, private enterprises and private sector not-for-profit organizations as "one size does not fit all."

International Financial Reporting Standards (IFRSs) 
For issues related to publicly accountable enterprises, agenda topics come from the following sources: 
 The AcSB adds a topic to its agenda when the IASB activates a project. Work proceeds in parallel with the IASB.  The AcSB contributes to the development of IFRSs by participating in consultations and activities of the IASB, as well as provides research for the IASB on certain projects. 
 The IFRS Discussion Group, a regular public forum to discuss issues that arise in Canada when applying IFRSs. The Group assists the AcSB in identifying and analyzing these issues so that the Board can raise them with the IASB and IFRS Interpretations Committee.

Standards for Private Enterprises, Not-for-Profit Organizations and Pension Plans 
Accounting standards for private enterprise (ASPE) issues come from many sources, including the following:
 The Private Enterprise Advisory Committee, which makes recommendations to the AcSB on potential changes to accounting standards for private enterprises. The AcSB staff also notifies the Committee of relevant developments in other jurisdictions.
 Committees, the AcSB or members of the public may raise issues, including issues regarding the application of ASPE.

At the AcSB's request, the Committee also reviews each new IFRS and standards developed by other Boards, including the U.S. FASB, and considers whether to recommend that some or all provisions of a standard be included in ASPE.

Not-for-profit organization issues also come from many sources, including:
 proposed changes to accounting standards for private enterprises that also apply to not-for-profit organizations; 
 the AcSB/PSAB Joint Not-for-Profit Task Force and its members; 
 AcSB members; and 
 members of the public.

For matters related to pension plans, AcSB members or members of the public may raise these.

Meetings 
The AcSB schedules meetings almost every month.

View the AcSB meeting calendar.

Relationship with CPA Canada 
CPA Canada is the national organization representing the Chartered Professional Accountant (CPA) profession in Canada. CPA Canada provides funding, staff and other resources to support an independent standard-setting process.

CPA Canada and the boards and oversight councils function at arm's length from one another. As a result, the boards and oversight councils as well as their staff carry out their standard-setting operations in an independent manner.

Accounting Standards Oversight Council (AcSOC)
The Accounting Standards Oversight Council (AcSOC) is an independent, volunteer body established by the Canadian Institute of Chartered Accountants (CICA)* in 2000 to serve the public interest by overseeing and providing input into the activities of the Accounting Standards Board (AcSB). In 2003, AcSOC started overseeing and providing input into the activities of the Public Sector Accounting Board (PSAB).
It oversees the activities of the AcSB and the Public Sector Accounting Board. The Council ensures the Boards follow its rigorous due process. AcSOC also appoints Board members and provides input on strategy and priorities. AcSOC also assesses and reports to the public on the performance of the Boards.

AcSOC serves the public interest by playing a key role in Canadian financial reporting by overseeing and evaluating the performance of, and providing input into, the activities of Canada's accounting standard-setting boards – the AcSB and PSAB.

Responsibilities 
See AcSOC's Terms of Reference.

Note: AcSOC is empowered by its terms of reference to take necessary, reasonable actions to carry out its responsibilities.

Membership 
AcSOC comprises between 20 and 25 voting members, including five non-voting members. View current AcSOC members.

The AcSOC membership consists of senior members from, amongst others, the following: 
 Business  
 Finance  
 Government  
 Academia  
 Accounting and legal professions 
 Regulators  
 Private sector not-for-profits 
 Financial analyst communities.

Members have a broad perspective of the complex issues facing standard setters.

Meetings 
AcSOC normally meets three times a year. To better serve the Council's objectives, additional meetings and conference calls may take place.

With the exception of administrative matters, meetings are generally open to public observation. Read the Guidelines for Observers for information on attending AcSOC meetings.

View the AcSOC meeting calendar.

AcSOC's Relationship with CPA Canada 
CPA Canada is the national organization representing the Chartered Professional Accountant (CPA) profession in Canada. CPA Canada provides funding, staff and other resources to support an independent standard-setting process.

CPA Canada and the boards and oversight councils function at arm's length from one another. As a result, the boards and oversight councils as well as their staff carry out their standard-setting operations in an independent manner.

See also 
List of accountancy bodies
Accounting Standards Review Board (New Zealand)
Accounting Standards Board (United Kingdom)
Accounting Standards (India)

References

External links
The Accounting Standards Board's Website
 The CICA and CMA Canada joined together January 1, 2013 to create CPA Canada as the national organization to support unification of the Canadian accounting profession under the CPA banner.

Canadian accounting associations
Accounting standards